Lectionary 324 (Gregory-Aland), designated by siglum ℓ 324 (in the Gregory-Aland numbering) is a Greek manuscript of the New Testament, on parchment. Palaeographically it has been assigned to the 13th century. The manuscript has not survived in complete condition.

Description 

The original codex contained lessons from the Gospel of John, Matthew, and Luke (Evangelistarium), on 189 parchment leaves. The leaves are measured. It has some lacunae at the beginning, the end and elsewhere. It contains also the Synaxarion (folios 160-189v) and other non-biblical matter.

The text is written in Greek minuscule letters, in two columns per page, 23 lines per page. The ink is brown.

The codex contains weekday Gospel lessons. It has some lessons from the Prophets and Epistles.

History 

Scrivener and Gregory dated the manuscript to the 13th century. It is presently assigned by the INTF to the 13th century.

It was purchased from Spyridon P. Lambros from Athens, 26 March 1859 (along with lectionaries 321, 322, and 323).

The manuscript was added to the list of New Testament manuscripts by Scrivener (272e) and Gregory (number 324e). Gregory saw it in 1883.

The manuscript was mentioned by Catalogue of Additions to the Manuscripts in the British Museum, 1854-1875, by M. Richard.

Currently the codex is housed at the British Library (Add MS 22744) in London.

The fragment is not cited in critical editions of the Greek New Testament (UBS4, NA28).

See also 

 List of New Testament lectionaries
 Biblical manuscript
 Textual criticism
 Lectionary 320

References

Bibliography

External links 
 Add MS 22744 Digitised Manuscripts

Greek New Testament lectionaries
13th-century biblical manuscripts
British Library additional manuscripts